Andrew Bernardo Schierhoff (February 10, 1922 – December 1, 1986) was a Roman Catholic bishop who served as the Auxiliary Bishop of La Paz, Bolivia.

Biography
Born in St. Louis, Missouri, Schierhoff was ordained to the priesthood on April 14, 1948, for the Roman Catholic Archdiocese of St. Louis.

On November 11, 1968, Schierhoff was appointed auxiliary bishop of the Roman Catholic Archdiocese of La Paz, Bolivia and titular bishop of Pumentum. He was consecrated bishop on January 2, 1969.

On December 12, 1982, he was appointed Prelate of Pando. He died while in office.

Notes

1922 births
1986 deaths
Clergy from St. Louis
American expatriate Roman Catholic bishops in South America
Roman Catholic Archdiocese of St. Louis
20th-century Roman Catholic bishops in Bolivia
Religious leaders from Missouri
20th-century American clergy
Roman Catholic bishops of La Paz
Roman Catholic bishops of Pando